The 2014 Vuelta a Andalucía was the 60th edition of the Vuelta a Andalucía cycle race and was held on 19 February to 23 February 2014. The race started in Almería and finished in Fuengirola. The race was won by Alejandro Valverde.

General classification

References

Vuelta a Andalucia
Vuelta a Andalucía by year
2014 in Spanish sport